Hugo Heliodoro Aguilar Naranjo (born January 4, 1952, in Suaita, Santander) is a Colombian policeman, businessman, and politician. He retired with the rank of Lieutenant Colonel. Served as governor of his home state of Santander from 2004 to 2007. In 1993, he led the operation that resulted in the death of Medellin Cartel founder Pablo Escobar.

In 2017, Aguilar admitted to the press that after shooting Escobar to death in 1993, he took his Sig Sauer pistol as a trophy.

First years

Son of Ciro Aguilar Garavito and Blanca Naranjo Coronado. He was a student at the Lucas Caballero Barrera school in his hometown and the Antonio Nariño de Moniquirá Institute. He entered the General Santander Police Cadet School on January 11, 1975, obtaining the rank of Lieutenant and Second Lieutenant on November 5, 1976, as part of course 39 of officers.

Career in the Colombian police

He served as an officer of the Chapinero Police Station in Bogotá in 1970; commander of the company of auxiliary bachilleres of the Magdalena Police Department in 1978; member of the Judicial Intelligence and Investigation Service of Bogotá in 1979; officer of the Carabineros School Alejandro Gutiérrez de Manizales, edecan (aide-de-camp) of the governor of Caldas and Lieutenant effective in 1980; Police commander of the municipalities of Carurú, Mapiripán and Miraflores in Guaviare, and of Tolú in Sucre; student of counter-guerrilla, lancer, grenadier, anti-explosives, carabinero, special operations and free pistol courses; promoted to captain in 1980 and destined like commander of counter-guerrillas for the zone of clearance of Florida, Pradera and Miranda in Valley; Police commander of Buga; plant officer of the Santander General School; special operations student of the Spanish Civil Guard and specialist in criminology at the Complutense University of Madrid in 1987; commander of the Special Operations Corps COPES; security chief of the Santander General School; Major in 1989; specialist in university teaching faculty at the University of Belgrano (1991); specialist in criminalistics of the University Institute of the Argentine Federal Police (1992); intelligence chief of Medellín; operational commander of the Search Block against the Medellin Cartel; student of command of staff and Latin American problems of Fort Benning (Columbus) and Lieutenant Colonel in 2004, rank in which he requested the retirement of the active service.

Strikes to the guerrilla

When the government of President Belisario Betancur advanced peace negotiations with the guerrilla called M-19; Aguilar was assigned with the rank of captain to the municipalities of Florida, Pradera and Miranda in Valle y Cauca with two groups of counter-guerrilla police, where he regained control of the area and dismissed several criminals and captured 19, counting among them the later demobilized and political Carlos Alonso Lucio, who was released with his colleagues after a presidential order.2

Hitting the drug trade

His most notable and remembered action took place on December 2, 1993, when he dismissed the Medellín Cartel chief, Pablo Escobar Gaviria, as a member of the Search Block against Drug Trafficking.

Distinctions and decorations

The National Police conferred him the decorations "civic star commander category"; "to the first class value" on three occasions, "category A services medal" for 15 years, "category A distinguished services" on three occasions, "cross for police merit" twice, "Gabriel González educational merit" and "Carlos medal Holguin Mallarino ". The National Army conferred on him twice the medal of distinguished services in public order.

In June 2006, the national government conferred the honorary degree of Coronel effective.3

Business trajectory 

Aguilar holds a degree in Educational Administration and a professional in business administration from the University of San Buenaventura; careers that served to practice university teaching and successfully advise agricultural and commercial companies, especially in the department of Santander. These results allowed him to occupy the presidency of the National Federation of Merchants chapters Guanentá and Comunera, and to represent the productive sector in the board of directors of the Corporación Ambiental de Santander (CAS) . He continued his training specializing in public management at the Universidad Industrial of Santander and administration of health entities.

Political career

First campaigns

Colonel Aguilar ventured into politics aspiring to the mayor of Suaita and the Council of San Gil, without being elected to these positions. In 2001, with the endorsement of the Citizen Convergence Party, he obtained the support of 17,000 Santandereans to become deputy to the Assembly of the Department.

Governor of Santander

The security, administrative and financial conditions had Santander in the bottom of the country, which prompted Aguilar to resign his seat in 2002 to present his name to the Government of Santander for the elections of October 2003, in which defeated the candidate of the Liberal Party, which had a 17-year hegemony controlling the territorial entity.

As the first independent governor of the traditional political parties in the history of Santander; Aguilar established a government program that he called 'Santander en Serio', based on the pillars of fulfilling campaign promises, recovering public order and security, cleaning up public finances, implementing quality and transparency systems, and establishing of the social investment in all the municipalities of the territory, as well as the economic promotion of the Department through the tourist activity.5

As a result of his government, he handed over the Chicamocha National Park as the engine of activation of a tourist cluster erected in the Chicamocha Canyon; the recovery of the public hospital network; the increase in primary education coverage by 86 percent; the paving of 230 kilometers of roads; implementation of two local economic development agencies; recovery of the Santander liquor store; the recovery of the identity and sense of belonging of the Department, institutionalizing May 13 as the day of santandereanidad, developing the chair of santandereanidad in public institutions and implementing the coat of arms of the Department; the creation of the Provincial Development Centers as a model for the organization of the territory; implementation of the ISO 9000 and GP1000 quality standard in contracting and financial management; recovery of the Neomundo interactive science and technology park in Bucaramanga; systematization of financial management; construction of a cocoa processing plant for Santander; recovery and management of the completion of the Barrancabermeja-Yondó bridge project on the Magdalena River.4

His cabinet of secretaries was integrated by Oscar Josué Reyes Cárdenas, Didier Alberto Tavera Amado, Rafael Valero Cetina and Manuel Enrique Niño Gómez in Government; Emilia Lucía Ospina Cadavid at Hacienda; Ricardo Flórez Rueda and Cristian Rojas Hernández in Health; Bonel Patiño Noreña, Héctor Murillo, Zoraida Celis Carrillo, Clara Isabel Rodríguez Serrano and Milce Idárraga de González in Education; Adolfo Pinilla Plata and Rafael Valero Cetina in Infrastructure; Luis Antonio Mesías Velasco and Luis Emilio Rojas Pabón in Planning; Didier Alberto Tavera Amado, Juan Carlos Sierra Ayala, Guillermo Henrique Gómez Paris, Samuel Prada Cobos and Holger Díaz Hernández in Development; Víctor Hugo Morales Núñez and Iván Darío Porras Gómez in Agriculture and Rural Development; Juana Yolanda Bazán Achury and Gladys Elfidia Ballesteros Miranda in General; Gilberto Tirado Pardo, Mary Matilde Quijano Orduz and María Aidé Afanador Moreno in Private; and Jorge Céspedes Camacho and Oscar Alfonso Téllez Valenzuela in Law.

Sanction and condemnation for the process of "parapolitica" [edit source | edit]
At the beginning of a new campaign to aspire to the Government of Santander, on January 31, 2011, was dismissed and disqualified by the Attorney General of the Nation for the exercise of public office for a period of 20 years, concluding that he had links with the paramilitary group Autodefensas Unidas de Colombia. In the criminal proceeding for the same case, he was issued an arrest warrant that became effective in July of the same year, 6 during the electoral process in which he promoted the name of his son Richard Aguilar to the Government of Santander, who was the winner in the October 2011 elections.

Thirteen months after being arrested, and based on the testimony issued by the paramilitary commander Salvatore Mancuso, the Supreme Court of Justice sentenced Colonel Aguilar to 9 years in prison for the crime of aggravated conspiracy, 7 which he complies with parole, after having remained in San Gil prison until March 2015.

Books
In addition to the management reports as Governor of Santander, Aguilar wrote the book entitled "Así Maté a Pablo Escobar", edited by Planeta in 2015 and with sales records in his country, Peru, Spain and Germany.

Popular culture 
 In TV Series Pablo Escobar, The Drug Lord is portrayed by Mario Ruiz as the character of Hugo Aguirre.

 In TV series Tres Caínes is portrayed by Andrés Soleibe as the character of Hugo Pallomar.

References

Living people
1952 births
Colombian police officers